Sofia Penkova (born 26 January 1979) is a Bulgarian former competitive figure skater. She represented Bulgaria at three European Championships, two World Championships, and the 1998 Winter Olympics in Nagano. She achieved her best result, 20th, at the 1998 European Championships in Milan.

Competitive highlights

References 

1979 births
Bulgarian female single skaters
Living people
Figure skaters from Sofia
Figure skaters at the 1998 Winter Olympics
Olympic figure skaters of Bulgaria